32nd Regiment or 32nd Infantry Regiment may refer to:

Infantry regiments
 32nd (Cornwall) Regiment of Foot, a unit of the United Kingdom Army
 32nd Infantry Regiment (United States), a unit of the United States Army
 32nd Infantry Regiment (Greece)

Armour regiments
 32nd Armor Regiment (United States), a unit of the United States Army

Artillery regiments
 32nd Regiment Royal Artillery, a unit of the United Kingdom Army
 Post Office Rifles (32nd Searchlight Regiment), a unit of the United Kingdom Army

Engineer regiments
 32 Combat Engineer Regiment, a unit of the Canadian Army
 32nd Alpine Engineer Regiment, a unit of the Italian Army
 32 Engineer Regiment (United Kingdom), a unit of the British Army's Royal Engineers

Signal regiments
 32 (Scottish) Signal Regiment, a unit of the United Kingdom Army

American Civil War Regiments
 32nd Regiment Alabama Infantry
 32nd Illinois Volunteer Infantry Regiment
 32nd Regiment Indiana Infantry
 32nd Iowa Volunteer Infantry Regiment
 32nd Regiment Kentucky Volunteer Infantry
 32nd Maine Infantry
 32nd Regiment of New York Volunteers
 32nd Wisconsin Volunteer Infantry Regiment

See also
 32nd Division (disambiguation)
 32nd Brigade (disambiguation)
 32nd Battalion (disambiguation)
 32nd Squadron (disambiguation)